The Juniper Passion is a 2011 opera by New Zealand composer Michael F. Williams to a libretto by John Davies. The opera is set in 1944 during the World War II Battle of Monte Cassino, an Allied victory, but with a loss of life totalling approximately 105,000 deaths, including many New Zealand soldiers, over the series of battles. The Juniper Passion is written in three acts, six principal roles and chorus and is scored for chamber orchestra with digital effects. Performance is through dance with only minimal movement and interaction by the singing cast. In place of traditional sets, the opera has a 3-D computer graphic set design by Sean Castle that recreates the Benedictine abbey at Cassino. This is interspersed with images taken during the battle by Richard Ferguson Davies, father of librettist John Davies.

Premiere
The first performance of The Juniper Passion was in April 2012 in Hamilton, New Zealand. Choreography for the event was by Moss Paterson who is the director of Atamira Dance and John Davies, the curriculum leader of live performance at the Unitec Institute of Technology Department of Performing and Screen Arts.

Recording
The Juniper Passion was recorded and produced in 2011 by Wayne Laird of the New Zealand label, Atoll Records. It made use of the Auckland Town Hall organs, digital effects created by the composer and a full cast of singers including New Zealand baritone David Griffiths and leading musicians including the New Zealand Chamber Soloists. Recording took place in both Auckland and Hamilton.

Characters

 Narrator
 Carlo, a Benedictine monk
 Joe, a New Zealand soldier
 Bruno, a German army officer
 Maria, Carlo's sister
 Helen, Joe and Jessie's daughter
 Jessie, Joe's wife
 Chorus

Scoring

The work is scored for string quartet, bass, flute, clarinet, trumpet, trombone, piano, percussion, organ, sound effects.

References

External links
 Music Live New Zealand
 University of Waikato Music Department
 SOUNZ Centre for New Zealand Music

New Zealand music
Operas
Chamber operas
2011 operas
English-language operas
World War II fiction
Operas set in the 20th century
Operas set in Italy